The Empire Polo Club is a 78-acre (32 ha) polo club in Indio, California in the Coachella Valley of Riverside County, approximately 22 miles southeast of Palm Springs. Founded in 1987, it has hosted international polo tournaments. It leases out its polo grounds for Coachella Valley Music and Arts Festival and Stagecoach Festival annually for the last three weekends in April.

Location
The club is located at 81-800 Avenue 51 within the city of Indio, in the Coachella Valley and Colorado Desert of Southern California. It is around a half hour drive from Palm Springs and a 2 to 2-and-a-half hour drive from Downtown Los Angeles or San Diego.

History
It was founded in 1987. It has twelve polo grounds, making it one of the largest polo clubs on the West coast of the United States.

It hosts local, national and international matches and tournaments. In 2013, it hosted a match between the British Schools and Universities Polo Association (SUPA) and the USPA Intercollegiate/Interscholastic. It has also hosted events for the Gay Polo League. In 2015, it hosted the USPA Townsend International Challenge Cup.

The grounds are owned by Alex Haagen III. Since 1993, the Empire Polo Club has leased its polo grounds annually to Goldenvoice, a subsidiary of the Anschutz Entertainment Group, the organizers of the Coachella Valley Music and Arts Festival and the Stagecoach Festival.

On October 30, 31 and November 1, 2009 it hosted  Phish held their 8th festival. During which on the Halloween show they performed The Rolling Stones'
Exile on Main Street in its entirety.

On October 7–9 and 14–16, 2016, it hosted Desert Trip, a music festival featuring legendary rock performers Bob Dylan, The Rolling Stones, Paul McCartney, Neil Young, Roger Waters and The Who.

On April 14 and 21, Beyoncé headlined the 2018 Coachella Valley Music and Arts Festival. Beyoncé was the first African American woman to headline the festival and her performance immediately received widespread critical acclaim. Many in the media described the show as "historic," while The New York Times proclaimed it as "meaningful, absorbing, forceful and radical." The performance was nicknamed "Beychella" by fans.

References

Polo clubs in the United States
Indio, California
Sports venues in Riverside County, California
Sports clubs established in 1987
1987 establishments in California